Richard A. Butler may refer to:

Rab Butler (Richard Austen Butler, 1902–1982), British Conservative politician
Richard A. Butler (Irish politician), Irish independent Senator